The Scenics are a band from Toronto, Ontario, Canada, active from 1976 to 1982, and from 2008 to the present. Their style incorporates punk rock, post-punk, and art punk. The Scenics appeared both in the 1979 Colin Brunton documentary film The Last Pogo and on the accompanying soundtrack album And Now Live from Toronto The Last Pogo with two tracks.

In 1980, the band released a full-length album, Underneath the Door on the Bomb Records label. Finally, in 1981, they released a single "Karen" b/w "See Me Smile" on their own Scenic Route Records label.

In 2008, The Scenics released a new album of 1977-1981 live material called How Does It Feel to Be Loved? The Scenics play the Velvet Underground. The group reformed in early 2008 and has even played a few gigs to support the release including an appearance at the June 2008 NXNE Festival in Toronto, Ontario, Canada.

In October 2009, the band released another compilation from their recording vaults, "Sunshine World (Studio Recordings 1977-78)". To promote the release, that same month, the band performed a series of live dates in Ontario and Quebec.

In 2012 the now-active band recorded Dead Man Walks Down Bayview for release on their own Dreamtower Records.  The album consists of new recordings of songs written over the last 20 years.

Members
Andy Meyers (guitar, bass, vocals, songwriter)
Ken Badger (guitar, bass vocals, songwriter)
Mike Young (guitar, bass)
Mark Perkell (drums)

Former members
Andy Meyers (guitar, bass, vocals, songwriter, saxophone from 1976 to 1982)
Ken Badger (guitar, bass vocals, songwriter from 1976 to 1982)
Mike Young (guitar, bass from May 1979 to June 1980)
Mark Perkell (drums from March 1980 to May 1982)
Mike Cusheon (drums from November 1976- February 1977)
Mark French (drums from May 1977 to June 1977)
Brad Cooper (drums from July 1977 to February 1980)
Ken Fox (now with The Fleshtones, bass from June 1980 to May 1982)

Discography

LPs
Underneath the Door (1979, Bomb/Rio Records)
How Does It Feel to Be Loved? The Scenics Play the Velvet Underground (2008, Dream Tower Records)
Sunshine World - Studio Recordings 1977-78 (2009, Dream Tower Records )
Dead Man Walks Down Bayview (2012, Dreamtower Records)

Singles
"Karen b/w See Me Smile" (1981, Scenic Route Records)

Compilations
 And Now Live from Toronto The Last Pogo (1979, Bomb Records)

See also 
 Toronto punk rock

References

External links
 thescenics.com Official Band Page
 Scenics Biography from The Canadian Pop Encyclopedia
 [ The Scenics] Allmusic

Musical groups established in 1976
Musical groups disestablished in 1982
Musical groups reestablished in 2008
Musical groups from Toronto
Canadian punk rock groups
1976 establishments in Ontario
1982 establishments in Ontario
2008 establishments in Ontario